La Vega Independent School District is a public school district based in Bellmead,  Texas (USA).

The district is located in central McLennan County and serves the city of Bellmead and parts of Waco.

In 2009, the school district was rated "academically acceptable" by the Texas Education Agency.

History
The La Vega Independent School District was formed in 1927 from the consolidation of the Pecan Grove, Oak Grove, and West Brook Schools.

Board members of the new district turned over the task of finding a name for the district to the PTAs of the former Oak Grove and Pecan Grove Schools.  Pecan Grove PTA favored Bellmead Schools, but Bellmead was not an incorporated city at the time. The Oak Grove PTA suggested La Vega Schools, taken from the Mexican land grant of Tomas de la Vega which encompassed the area where the new school was to be built. The final vote was 25 to 4 in favor of La Vega.

Schools
La Vega High School (Grades 9-12)
La Vega Junior High – George Dixon Campus (Grades 7-8)
La Vega Intermediate – H.P. Miles Campus (Grades 4-6)
La Vega Elementary (Grades 1-3)
La Vega Primary (Grades PK-K)

References

Notes

External links
La Vega ISD

School districts in McLennan County, Texas
School districts established in 1927
1927 establishments in Texas